Lepidochrysops desmondi, the Desmond's blue, is a butterfly in the family Lycaenidae. It is found in south-western Kenya, Tanzania, northern Malawi and Zambia. The habitat consists of Brachystegia woodland.

Both sexes are attracted to flowers. Adults are on wing year-round, with a peak in November.

References

Butterflies described in 1951
Lepidochrysops